Claude Haldi (28 November 1942 – 25 December 2017) was a Swiss racing driver. He was known as a frequent competitor at the 24 Hours of Le Mans, entering the race 22 times between 1968 and 1993. His endurance racing career was associated with Porsche, with 14 of his Le Mans entries in various Porsche models. He drove for the Porsche factory works teams of Martini Racing in 1973 and Rothmans Porsche in 1987. 

Beginning in 1985, he drove for the WM Peugeot team. He was a co-driver of the WM P88 which broke the top speed record at Circuit de la Sarthe in 1988.

Haldi also participated in hill climbs and rallying. He won the Group 4 category of the European Hill Climb Championship in 1970 and the 1979 Swiss Rally Championship.

Following his retirement from racing, Haldi became president of the Vaud Automobile Club. In this position he advocated against the Swiss ban on motorsport and proposed the creation of a Formula One circuit in Switzerland.

Racing record

Complete 24 Hours of Le Mans results

References

1942 births
2017 deaths
Swiss racing drivers
24 Hours of Le Mans drivers
World Sportscar Championship drivers
Porsche Motorsports drivers
Sportspeople from Lausanne